Virtual Open Tennis is a Sega Saturn video game developed by Arc System Works. It was published by Imagineer in Japan on October 27, 1995 and by Acclaim in North America and Europe in 1996.

Gameplay
Virtual Open Tennis is a tennis video game.

Reception
Next Generation reviewed the Saturn version of the game, rating it three stars out of five, and stated that "If you're the kind of gamer who's pleased with the way tennis games currently play, then take a look at Virtual Open Tennis. But if squinting to see where that little ball is makes you tremble with rage, then waiting for a serious advance in the tennis videogame is advised."

Reviews
GameFan (Feb, 1996)
Hobby Consolas - May, 1996
Mean Machines - Jan, 1996
All Game Guide - 1998

Legacy
In October of 2018, the game's rights were acquired by Canadian production company Liquid Media Group along with other titles originally owned by Acclaim Entertainment.

References

1995 video games
Acclaim Entertainment games
Arc System Works games
Imagineer games
Sega Saturn games
Sega Saturn-only games
Tennis video games
Video games developed in Japan